Philippe Martínez is a French film producer, director, screenwriter, actor, and former President of the Odéon Theater in Marseille.

Career
From 1988 through 1990, Martinez was President of the Odéon Theater, Marseille. In late 1990, he moved to the United States and became Chairman of the Board of Ulysses Entertainment.  From 1996-1999 he headed Los Angeles-based Betar Entertainment and served as executive producer on Ultimate Weapon and In Her Defense.  In 1999, Martinez launched Bauer-Martinez Studios and produced over 14 films including The Piano Player, Out of Season, The Defender, Dot.Kill, House of 9, and Land of the Blind.  More recently, he produced Modigliani. As film director, Martinez completed Citizen Verdict, Wake of Death, The Steam Experiment, and Viktor.

Filmography

Producer
 The Night and the Moment (1994)
 Getting In (1994)
 Musketeers Forever (1998)
 The Ultimate Weapon (1998)
 In Her Defense (1999)
 The Collectors (1999)
 The Piano Player (2002) 
 The Contract (2002) 
 The Good War (2002)
 Shoreditch (2003) 
 Citizen Verdict (2003) 
 Absolon (2003) 
 Out of Season (2004) 
 The Defender (2004) 
 Wake of Death (2004) 
 Making of Wake of Death (2004)
 Modigliani (2004)
 Harsh Times (2005) 
 House of 9 (2005) 
 Van Wilder: The Rise of Taj (2006) 
 The Groomsmen (2006) 
 Irish Jam (2006) 
 Land of the Blind (2006)
 The Number One Girl (2006) 
 The Flock (2007) 
 The Christmas Miracle of Jonathan Toomey (2007) 
 I Could Never Be Your Woman (2007) 
 Mexican Sunrise (2007) 
 The Chaos Experiment (2009)
 Game of Death (2010)
 General Commander (2019)
 Salvage Marines (2022)

Director
 Citizen Verdict (2003)
 Wake of Death (2004)
 The Steam Experiment (2009)
 Viktor (2014)
 General Commander (2019)
 Father Christmas Is Back (TBA)
 Christmas in the Caribbean (2022)
Screenwriter
 Musketeers Forever (1998)
 Citizen Verdict (2003)
 Wake of Death (2004)
 Viktor (2014)
 General Commander (2019)
Actor
 Déjà mort (1998)
 The Piano Player (2002) as Fernand
 All About April (2012)
 Little Reaper (2013) as Zombie Victim

References

External links
 
 

French film directors
French film producers
French emigrants to the United States
French-language film directors
Film producers from California
American television directors
Year of birth missing (living people)
Living people
Film directors from Los Angeles